Oxley River, a perennial river of the Tweed River catchment, is located in the Northern Rivers region of New South Wales, Australia.

Course and features
Formed by the confluence of the Hopping Dicks Creek and Tyalgum Creek, Oxley River rises below Mount Durigan on the southern slopes of the McPherson Range, near Tyalgum, and flows generally south by east, and then east, before reaching its confluence with the Tweed River near Murwillumbah. The river descends  over its  course.

In 2007, the federal government proposed damming the Rous River, Oxley River and Byrrill Creek. Local opposition to the plan was formed via the Save the Caldera Rivers Campaign, in an effort to stop the proposed dams from being built.

See also

 List of rivers of Australia

References

External links
 

 

Rivers of New South Wales
Northern Rivers
Tweed Shire